Dan Hugo (born 1 July 1985 in Worcester, South Africa) is a professional XTERRA triathlete based in Stellenbosch, South Africa. He matriculated in 2003 at the well-known Paul Roos Gymnasium, in Stellenbosch.

Results

External links
archive of official website (link usurped)

South African male triathletes
1985 births
Living people
People from Worcester, South Africa
Sportspeople from the Western Cape